Indian Federation of Labour is a federation of trade unions in India. IFL was founded in 1941 by M.N. Roy, after a split from the All India Trade Union Congress. IFL strongly supported the British war effort. Maniben Kara was a prominent IFL leader in the railways and V.B. Karnik was a prominent IFL leader amongst the dock workers.

In 1944 IFL was widely discredited as it was revealed that the organisation had received funding from the British authorities. IFL was able to retain some influence in Bombay and maintained contacts in scattered pockets. After the war, both AITUC and IFL were recognised by the government, for the purpose of representing Indian labour in the ILO.

In December 1948 IFL merged into the Hind Mazdoor Sabha.

References

Labour movement in India
National trade union centres of India
Defunct trade unions of India
Trade unions established in 1941
Trade unions disestablished in 1948